Helene Liliendahl Brydensholt (born 8 August 1987) is a Danish politician and member of the Folketing, the national legislature. A member of The Alternative party, she has represented North Zealand since November 2022.

Brydensholt was born on 8 August 1987 in Roskilde. She has a degree in anthropology from the University of Copenhagen (2015). She is a communications manager for Ecouture ApS. 

Brydensholt is married and has three children.

Notes

References

External links

1987 births
21st-century Danish women politicians
Living people
Members of the Folketing 2022–2026
People from Helsingør
The Alternative (Denmark) politicians
University of Copenhagen alumni
Women members of the Folketing